Samsung Galaxy A7 refers to four Samsung Galaxy Android smart phones released in the 2010s.

These are:
Samsung Galaxy A7 (2014); Android smartphone unveiled in January 2014, released in February 2014.
Samsung Galaxy A7 (2015); Android smartphone released in December 2015.
Samsung Galaxy A7 (2016); Android smartphone released in January 2016.
Samsung Galaxy A7 (2017); Android smartphone released in January 2017.
Samsung Galaxy A7 (2018); Android smartphone released in September 2018.
As a result of Samsung turning Samsung Galaxy J series into Samsung Galaxy A Series, the successor of Samsung Galaxy A7 (2018) is Samsung Galaxy A70.